The Seoul National University Hospital massacre was a massacre of 700 to 900 doctors, nurses, inpatient civilians and wounded soldiers by the Korean People's Army (KPA) on 28 June 1950 at the Seoul National University Hospital, Seoul district of South Korea. During the First Battle of Seoul, the KPA wiped out one platoon which guarded Seoul National University Hospital on 28 June 1950. They massacred medical personnel, inpatients and wounded soldiers. The Korean People's Army shot or buried the people alive. The civilian victims alone numbered 900. According to South Korean Ministry of National Defense, the victims included 100 wounded South Korean soldiers.

See also
Bodo League massacre
Jeju Uprising
Mungyeong massacre
Geochang massacre
Hill 303 massacre
List of massacres in South Korea

References

Attacks on hospitals
Massacres in South Korea
Mass murder in 1950
Korean War crimes
Massacres committed by North Korea
North Korean war crimes
War crimes in South Korea
1950 in South Korea
Seoul National University
1950s in Seoul
June 1950 events in Asia
Mass shootings in South Korea
Massacres in 1950